Armen Sanamyan (born 1 February 1966) is an Armenian professional football coach and former player.

Managerial career
On 2 June 2020, Sanamyan was announced as caretaker manager of Armenian club Lori.

Career statistics

International

References

1966 births
Living people
Armenian footballers
FC Kotayk Abovyan players
FC Ararat Yerevan players
FC Pyunik players
Nejmeh SC players
Racing Club Beirut players
Zvartnots-AAL FC players
Lebanese Premier League players
Association football midfielders
Armenia international footballers
Armenian expatriate footballers
Expatriate footballers in Lebanon
Armenian expatriate sportspeople in Lebanon
Armenian football managers
Armenian expatriate football managers
Expatriate football managers in Lebanon
Lebanese Premier League managers
Nejmeh SC managers